Finlay John Macdonald  (4 July 1925 – 14 October 1987) was a Scottish journalist and radio and television producer and writer.

Born and raised on Harris in the Outer Hebrides, and a native Gaelic language speaker, was an important figure in Gaelic radio and television broadcasting, founding the Gaelic Drama Association. He co-founded the quarterly Gaelic magazine Gairm in 1951 with Derick Thomson and served as its chief editor until 1964.

Macdonald edited A Journey to the Western Isles (1983), in which he "retraced" the 1773 tour of Scotland by Samuel Johnson and James Boswell by providing the text of Johnson's A Journey to the Western Islands of Scotland along with his own commentary and numerous colour and black-and-white photographs.

He was a radio and television producer. He wrote three books of memoirs that recall his childhood on Harris:
  Crowdie and Cream (1982)
  Crotal and White (1983)
  The Corncrake and the Lysander (1985).

These have been cited as providing a valuable insight into life in the Outer Hebrides in the inter-war years.

References

1925 births
1987 deaths
Scottish journalists
Scottish radio producers
Scottish television producers
20th-century Scottish writers
People from Harris, Outer Hebrides
Scottish memoirists
Scottish magazine editors